The near-close front rounded vowel, or near-high front rounded vowel, is a type of vowel sound, used in some spoken languages.

Handbook of the International Phonetic Association defines  as a mid-centralized (lowered and centralized) close front rounded vowel (transcribed  or ), and the current official IPA name of the vowel transcribed with the symbol  is near-close near-front rounded vowel. However, acoustic analysis of cardinal vowels as produced by Daniel Jones and John C. Wells has shown that basically all cardinal front rounded vowels (so not just  but also ) are near-front (or front-central) in their articulation, so  may be just a lowered cardinal , a vowel that is intermediate between cardinal  and cardinal . In many languages that contrast close, near-close and close-mid front rounded vowels, there is no appreciable difference in backness between them.

In some languages, however,  is used to transcribe a vowel that is as low as close-mid but still fits the definition of a lowered and centralized (or just lowered) cardinal . It occurs in German Standard German as well as some dialects of English (such as Estuary), and it can be transcribed with the symbol  (a lowered ) in narrow transcription. For the close-mid front rounded vowel that is not usually transcribed with the symbol  (or ), see close-mid front rounded vowel.

In most languages, the rounded vowel is pronounced with compressed lips (in an exolabial manner). However, in a few cases, the lips are protruded (in an endolabial manner), such as in Swedish, which contrasts the two types of rounding.

Transcription
This is the case in several Germanic language varieties, as well as in some transcriptions of Shanghainese.

In the following table, the difference between compressed and protruded vowels is ignored, except in the case of Swedish.

Near-close front compressed vowel
There is no dedicated diacritic for compression in the IPA. The spread-lip diacritic  may also be used with a rounded vowel letter  as an  symbol, though technically 'spread' means unrounded.

Features

 The prototypical  has a weak compressed rounding, more like  than the neighboring cardinal vowels.

Occurrence
Because front rounded vowels are assumed to have compression, and few descriptions cover the distinction, some of the following may actually have protrusion.

Near-close front protruded vowel

Catford notes that most languages with rounded front and back vowels use distinct types of labialization, protruded back vowels and compressed front vowels. However, a few languages, such as Scandinavian languages, have protruded front vowels. One of them, Swedish, even contrasts the two types of rounding in front vowels as well as height and duration.

As there are no diacritics in the IPA to distinguish protruded and compressed rounding, the old diacritic for labialization, will be used here as an ad hoc symbol for protruded front vowels.

For the close-mid front protruded vowel that is not usually transcribed with the symbol  (or ), see close-mid front protruded vowel.

Acoustically, this sound is "between" the more typical compressed near-close front vowel  and the unrounded near-close front vowel .

Features

 The prototypical  has a weak rounding (though it is compressed, rather than protruded), more like  than the neighboring cardinal vowels.

Occurrence

References

Sources

External links
 
 

Near-close vowels
Front vowels
Rounded vowels